Amadeus IV (119711 June 1253) was Count of Savoy from 1233 to 1253.

Amadeus was born in Montmélian, Savoy.  The legitimate heir of Thomas I of Savoy and Margaret of Geneva, he had however to fight with his brothers for the inheritance of Savoy's lands after their father's death. His brothers Pietro and Aimone spurred a revolt in Aosta Valley against Amadeus, but he was able to crush it with the help of Manfred III of Saluzzo and Boniface II of Montferrat, who were his sons-in-law. Together with his brother, Thomas, he fought against the communes of Turin and Pinerolo, but with uncertain results.

He was succeeded by his young son Boniface.

Career

Head of the family
As the eldest son of Thomas I of Savoy, Amadeus inherited the county and associated lands on his father's death in 1233.  However, his brothers Peter and Aymon demanded that he divide the territories and give them their share.  In July 1234, he and his brother William convened a family meeting at Château de Chillon.  While both sides arrived with armed troops, William was able to negotiate a treaty between the brothers.  This treaty kept the lands intact, but recognized the authority of the younger brothers within certain regions under Amadeus.  These territories were on the frontiers of Savoy lands, designed to encourage the brothers to expand the county rather than diminish it.  When his brother Thomas left his career in the church in 1235, Amadeus granted him similar territories.

Before he had a son, Amadeus changed his mind many times regarding his will.  Initially, he had made his sons-in-law his heirs, but in 1235, he rewrote his will in favour of his brother Thomas.  In December of that year, it went back to having his sons-in-law as heirs, until Amadeus was preparing for the siege.  Then he rewrote the will in favour of Thomas.  In March 1239, his daughters convinced him to return it to their favour.  On 4 November 1240, Thomas returned and persuaded him to rewrite the will in his brother's favour again.  When Thomas left, once again the will was reversed.  His final will was written in 1252, leaving the title and nearly everything to his son, Boniface, and naming his brother Thomas as regent and second in line for the title.

Among European powers
Amadeus faced many challenges in balancing the demands of the greater powers in Europe at that time.  Henry III of England wrote to Amadeus in 1235 to seek his consent and blessing to marry the Count's niece, Eleanor of Provence  In 1238, Amadeus went to the court of Frederick II, Holy Roman Emperor, in Turin, where he was knighted by the Emperor.  Then with his brothers, he led troops as part of the siege of Brescia.  In July 1243, Amadeus and his brother Thomas were ordered by Enzo of Sardinia to join him in a siege of Vercelli, which had recently switched allegiances from the Empire to the Pope.  Not only was the attack on the city unsuccessful, but Amadeus and his brother were excommunicated for it.  When the brothers wrote to the new Pope Innocent IV to appeal the excommunication, he granted their request.

In late 1244, when Pope Innocent IV fled from Rome, Amadeus met him in Susa and escorted him through the passes to Chambéry, and then provided his brother Philip as escort for the Pope downriver to Lyon.  However, Amadeus was then willing to open the same passes to the imperial army.  He also signed a treaty with Henry III on 16 January 1246 which gave rights of passage through the passes to the English in exchange for an annual payment of 200 marks.  That same month, Amadeus joined a force which went to Provence to rescue his niece, Beatrice of Provence from the forces of Frederick and escort her to her marriage to Charles of Anjou  By May 1247, Frederick was ready to move against the Pope.  He had gathered his army in Turin, and ordered those still loyal to him in the kingdoms of Arles and France to meet at Chambéry (the capital of Savoy).  However, the revolt of Parma pulled Frederick back from this plan.  That same summer, Amadeus blocked an attempt by the Pope to send 1500 soldiers to the Lombard League.  On 8 November 1248, Frederick asked Amadeus and his brother Thomas to go to Lyon and start negotiations for peace. However, their efforts were unsuccessful and war continued until the death of Frederick.

Family and children
He married twice, and each marriage produced children

c. 1217, he married Marguerite of Burgundy, daughter of Hugh III, Duke of Burgundy.
 Beatrice of Savoy (d. 1258), married firstly in 1233 Manfred III of Saluzzo (d. 1244), married secondly on 21 April 1247 Manfred of Sicily
 Margaret of Savoy (d. 1254), married firstly on 9 December 1235 Boniface II of Montferrat, married secondly Aymar III, Count of Valentinois
on 18 Dec 1244, he married Cecilia of Baux, "Passerose", daughter of Barral of Baux
 Boniface, Count of Savoy
 Beatrice of Savoy (1250 – 23 February 1292) married Peter of Chalon and Infante Manuel of Castile.
 Eleonor of Savoy, married in 1269 Guichard de Beaujeu
 Constance of Savoy, died after 1263

References

Sources

1197 births
1253 deaths
13th-century Counts of Savoy
People from Savoie
Dukes of Chablais
Burials at Hautecombe Abbey